Karen Lydia Aabye (19 September 1904 – 15 September 1982) was a Danish writer. In the late 1930s, she worked as a journalist in Paris and London before she gained popularity with a number of historical novels in which strong-willed women were her main characters. Her works also include travel books and a collection of essays.

Biography
The daughter of Rudolph Christian Aabye, a wholesale merchant from Norrebro, Aabye grew up in Copenhagen, attending Karen Kjær's School. After her school exams, she worked as an office clerk then became a well traveled journalist. In 1929, she went to Paris, where she spent three years working for the weekly Skandinaver i Paris. On her return to Denmark, she worked as an editorial secretary for Politikens Lytterblad. From 1936 to 1937, she was a foreign correspondent for Politiken, first in London and then in Paris. In 1937, she moved to the daily Berlingske Tidende with which she maintained a relationship for the rest of her working life. Her reports, commentaries and essays are evidence of her deep interest in the developments of the pre-war period.

After her debut novel, Der er langt til Paris (There is a lond way to Paris) in 1939, her breakthrough as a novelist came during World War II with a trilogy consisting of Det skete ved Kisum Bakke (It happened at Kisum Bakke) in 1942, Fruen til Kejsergården (The Lady of the Emperor) in 1943 and Vi, der elsker livet (We who love life) in 1944 all of which trace developments in the life of a strong-willed woman living in the north of Zealand in the 19th century. Also popular was her Martine series (1950–54), a five-volume novel based in 19th-century rural Jutland and tracing the lives of people who emigrated to America. The series consists of Martine (1950), Min søn Janus (My son Janus) 1951, Brænd dine skibe (Burn your ships) 1952, Det gyldne land (The Golden Country) 1953 and Den røde dal (The Red Valley) 1954. Karen Aabye was also successful with her fictional biographies: Grevinden af Bagsværd (Countess of Bagsværd) 1958, and Min bedstemor er jomfru (My grandmother is a virgin) 1965.

In all her novels, her female characters excel in their reasoning, sensitivity and strength while her stories are situated in a variety of environments, convincingly depicting people from various walks of life: circus folk, farmers, emigrants or the aristocracy. All her stories have a happy outcome although in some cases the conclusion appears a little artificial.

She also wrote travel books based on her own experiences. These include Dejligt, at Amerika ikke ligger langt herfra (Nice that America is not far from here) 1949, and Irland — min tossed ø (Ireland - my tossed island) 1963. Her collected essays were published as Fra mit skovhus (From my forest house) in 1968.

Aabye's villa

Aabye's villa in Bagsværd which she called Kisum Bakke, was designed by Elliot Hjuler and completed in May 1944. On 22 December 1944, the house was dynamited by the Brøndumbande terror group who sympathized with the Germans. Aabye who was a member of the Holger-Danske chapter of the Danish Resistance was not at home at the time. The house was rebuilt in 1945 and enlarged in 1956. Aabye died in Bagsværd on September 15, 1982 at the age of 77.

Bibliography 

 Der er langt til Paris, 1939
 En kvinde har alt, 1940
 Vi skal ikke ha' penge tilbage!, 1941
 Det skete ved Kisum Bakke, 1942
 Fruen til Kejsergården, 1943
 Vi, der elsker livet, 1944
 Jupiter glemmer aldrig, 1945
 Vi skal snart hjem, 1946
 Flugten til Sverige, 1947
 Kvinde, gå mod solen, 1947
 Branden  Magasin du Monde, 1948
 Dejligt, at Amerika ikke ligger langt herfra, 1949
 Martine, 1950
 Ferie i himlen, 1951
 Min søn Janus, 1951
 Brænd dine skibe, 1952
 Det gyldne land, 1953
 Grønt er mit hjerte, 1953
 Den røde dal, 1954
 Skibet er ladet med, 1954
 Den første ørkenbrand, 1955
 Italiensk romance, 1955
 Lille gule sky, 1957
 Grevinden af Bagsværd, 1958
 Vi kan sagtens, 1958
 Iwan, 1959
 Vi er så unge, 1961
 Irland—min tossed ø, 1963
 Min bedstemor er jomfru, 1965
 Pesten går i rødt, jomfru Dorthe, 1966
 Ursula, 1967
 Fra mit skovhus, 1968
 Constance, 1972
 Grønne horisonter, 1973
 Ørnens rede, 1974
 Da jeg så Robert, 1979
 Dyr der krydsede min vej, 1980

References

Danish women novelists
Danish women journalists
Danish female resistance members
Writers from Copenhagen
People from Gladsaxe Municipality
1904 births
1982 deaths
20th-century Danish women writers
20th-century Danish writers
20th-century Danish novelists